Indo National Limited is a company that manufactures batteries in India. The corporate office is in the South-Indian city of Chennai, Tamil Nadu.The company spans 33 offices through the country. Nippo batteries reach millions of homes through 35 distributors, over 2800 stockists, 900 vans and 500 autos covering over 5 lakh (500,000) retail outlets. Nippo is the second largest dry cell battery manufacturer in India, with 28% of the market in 2006. They even started exporting batteries from year 1976 and the first consignment exported to Yemen.

Production
Nippo has two main production facilities for its batteries, Nellore and Tada both in Andhra Pradesh.

Achievements

Nippo has received many awards. One of their Products, Nippo Gold was rated the 'Best Performing AA cell' in the country.
The recent award they got is "Best Management Award 2010"

Products

Nippo manufactures many batteries of various types. Their products include:

UM-1S - Nippo Hyper, Nippo Super, Nippo Special, Nippo Super Smart, Nippo Hyper.

AA- Nippo Gold, Nippo Hyper, Nippo Super.

Apart from batteries Nippo also manufactures appliances mainly torches. Some other products manufactured by Nippo are Power Station, Compact Fluorescent Lamp and Emergency Power.

References

External links
Business Week company information
Nippo's Official Site

Consumer battery manufacturers
Chemical companies of India
Manufacturing companies based in Chennai
Chemical companies established in 1972
Indian brands
Indian companies established in 1972
1972 establishments in Tamil Nadu
Companies listed on the National Stock Exchange of India